Bukit Timah Group Representation Constituency is a defunct five-member Group Representation Constituency located in the western area of Singapore. It consists of largely Bukit Timah areas, and including parts of Jurong, Clementi and Bukit Batok areas as well. The GRC has only appeared once in 1997 which the ruling party, People's Action Party received a walkover on the nomination day, which is similar to Kreta Ayer–Tanglin GRC's fate.

It was headed by Minister in Prime Minister's Office Lim Boon Heng during the last tenure from 1997 to 2001.

Members of Parliament

Candidates and results

See also
Bukit Timah SMC

References

Singaporean electoral divisions
Bukit Batok
Bukit Timah
Jurong East
Jurong West